Rutherford County Schools can refer to:
Rutherford County Schools (North Carolina)
Rutherford County Schools (Tennessee)